The current flag of Montgomery County, Maryland, was adopted on October 5, 1976. It was designed by the British College of Arms. It is commonly flown outside of the Montgomery County's governmental facilities, such as fire stations.
 
The flag is based on the coat of arms of the Montgomery family, a scion of which, Richard Montgomery, gave the county its name. It is the county's second flag, replacing the first one, which had been in use from May 3, 1944, until its replacement in 1976.

History

Former flag: 1944–1976
A former flag was used by Montgomery County from May 3, 1944, until October 1976. It was designed by Lilly Catherine Stone and featured the former Montgomery County coat of arms along on a white background, inscribed with the county's name and the date it was founded.

Current flag: 1976–present
The current flag is a banner of the arms granted to the county by England's College of Heralds. At the request of the Montgomery County Executive, it was officially adopted by the Montgomery County Council as the county flag by Bill 38-76 on October 5, 1976. Bill 38-76 has since been designated as Section 1-402 of the Montgomery County Code.

The fleur-de-lis in two quarters of the flag comes from the arms of the Montgomery family. The oldest known depiction of the Montgomery fleur-de-lis appears on the seal of John de Mundegumri, who lived in the late 12th century.  In 1368, the family's chief Sir John Montgomery married Elizabeth, the heiress of the Eglinton family, whose arms incorporated three rings. Their descendants combined the Montgomery fleurs-de-lis with the Eglinton rings in one quartered shield.

The indented line which separates the upper and lower quarters of the flag represent the borders of local government. The shades of red and blue are identical to those on the American flag, whereas the shade of gold is identical to that found on the Maryland state flag, denoted as PMS 124 on the Pantone Matching System scale.

Design
According to the Montgomery County government in 1999, the flag was described as:

Colors
The official description of the flag in the county code states that the shade of red and blue used on the flag are to be identical to that found on the county's coat of arms.

See also

Flag of Maryland
Flag of Prince George's County, Maryland
Montgomery County, Maryland

References

External links

 

Montgomery County
Flag of Montgomery County, Maryland
Montgomery County, Maryland
Montgomery County, Maryland
Flag
1976 establishments in Maryland